Rothbury was a railway station in Northumberland, England at the end of the single-track Rothbury Branch that served the town of Rothbury. Rothbury was the terminus of the line with a turntable at the end of the track.

History

They also were permitted to build a short branch line to Cornhill. The North British Railway and the branch line became part of the London and North Eastern Railway in 1923. In September 1952 passenger services were withdrawn and the line closed in November 1963.

Originally built in wood, the station was rebuilt in stone in 1899. It has been demolished and the site is now an industrial estate.

References

External links
Rothbury Station on Northumbrian Railways
Rothbury Station on Disused Stations
Rothbury Station on a navigable 1956 O. S. map
Plans of the Station
The line on RailScot

Disused railway stations in Northumberland
Former North British Railway stations
Railway stations in Great Britain opened in 1870
Railway stations in Great Britain closed in 1963
Rothbury